Hitori is a logic puzzle.

Hitori (Japanese ひとり "alone") may also refer to:

People
Hitori Kumagai (熊谷 独  1936)

Books
Hito Hitori Futari (Japanese: ヒトヒトリフタリ, "One Person as Two")  seinen manga by Tsutomu Takahashi

Music

Albums
Hitori (album) Jun Shibata 柴田淳 2004

Songs
"Hitori" (Mika Nakashima song), 2005
"Hitori" (ja), song by Gospellers 
"Hitori" (ja), song by Yui Asaka
"Hitori" (ja), song by Miyuki Nakajima 
"Hitori Jenga", by Hitomi Yaida  
"Hitori Janai" (ひとりじゃない I'm Not Alone), by Deen
"Hitori no Yoru" (ヒトリノ夜  Lonely night), by  Porno Graffitti
"Hitori Yori Futari", by Fayray